Matej Falat (born 8 February 1993) is a Slovakian alpine skier. He competed for Slovakia at the 2014 Winter Olympics in the alpine skiing events. Won a silver medal at the 2017 World Alpine Skiing Championships in the mixed team event.

World Championship results

Olympic results

References

1993 births
Living people
Olympic alpine skiers of Slovakia
Alpine skiers at the 2014 Winter Olympics
Alpine skiers at the 2018 Winter Olympics
Sportspeople from Bojnice
Slovak male alpine skiers
Universiade medalists in alpine skiing
Universiade silver medalists for Slovakia
Universiade bronze medalists for Slovakia
Competitors at the 2015 Winter Universiade
Competitors at the 2017 Winter Universiade